Zyuzin is a Russian surname. Notable people with the surname include:

Andrei Zyuzin (born 1978), Russian ice hockey player
Dmitri Zyuzin (born 1987), Russian ice hockey player
Igor Zyuzin (born 1960), Russian businessman
Maksim Zyuzin (born 1986), Russian footballer

See also
Zyuzino (disambiguation)

Russian-language surnames